Large and in Charge is a 1989 comedy rap album by Arsenio Hall, released under the name of his "portly rapping alter ego" Chunky A. It is his only release under this name.

Background
Arsenio Hall began hosting The Arsenio Hall Show in 1989, and that same year, recorded and released the Large and in Charge album as Chunky A. Chunky A was marketed humorously as Hall's overweight younger brother who had been a roadie for Barry Manilow. Hall wrote the album and was a co-producer. The album was a minor hit, reaching #71 on the Billboard 200, and one single, "Owwww!", charted, reaching #77 on the Billboard Hot 100. "Owwww!"'s music video featured Hall in a fatsuit wearing a necklace chain with a large golden "A" on it. "Sorry" was also released as a single, but did not chart. The album included the tracks "Ho Is Lazy" (a parody of Fine Young Cannibals' "She Drives Me Crazy") and "Dope, the Big Lie" (an anti-drug song featuring Paula Abdul, Wil Wheaton, and Ice-T). 

Contemporaneous reviews of the album were mixed. The Orlando Sentinel remarked, "Although he's occasionally mildly funny, Chunk's rhymes are less def than deficient - and less dope than dopey." The Los Angeles Times gave the album three stars out of five, describing the album as "a raunchy, frequently hilarious album that's part rap--reflecting influences by the Fat Boys and Heavy D--and part funk, done in the talk-singing style of George Clinton and Cameo's Larry Blackmon."

Track listing
"Owwww!"
"Large and in Charge"
"Stank Breath"
"Ho Is Lazy"
"Sorry"
"I Command You to Dance"
"Very High Key"
"Dipstick"
"Dope, the Big Lie"

References

1989 albums
Hip hop albums by American artists
Comedy rap albums